Steineropsis laceratula is a species of crustose placodioid lichen in the family Pannariaceae. It was first formally described in 1902 by French lichenologist Auguste-Marie Hue as Pannaria laceratula. Per Magnus Jørgensen proposed a transfer to Fuscopannaria in 1994. The taxon shuffled genera again in 2020 by Toby Spribille and Stefan Ekman after molecular phylogenetic analysis of the DNA from specimens collected in Alaska revealed its correct classification in the genus Steineropsis.

References

Peltigerales
Lichen species
Lichens described in 1902
Lichens of Subarctic America
Lichens of Japan
Fungi without expected TNC conservation status
Taxa named by Auguste-Marie Hue